Jane's 688(i) Hunter/Killer is a 1997 submarine simulator video game, developed by Sonalysts Inc. and published by Electronic Arts and more recently by Strategy First for Windows 95 compatible operating systems. It is named after the 688 (Improved)  of United States (SSN) submarine, and was a successor to the earlier game 688 Attack Sub. It's part of the Jane's Combat Simulations series. It was released on Valve's Steam content delivery service as well as DotEmu.

Development
688(I) Hunter/Killer was developed by Sonalysts Inc., which had previously developed submarine simulations and wargames for the United States Department of Defense. The developers limited themselves to plausible real world scenarios, based on projections from Jane's Information Group. Because of the authentic tactics and technology being simulated, Sonalysts had the Pentagon review the game to ensure that it did not contain any valuable military secrets.

The game was developed using custom software tools, with the exception of the ship models, which were done using PowerAnimator.

Reception
T. Liam McDonald gave 688(I) Hunter/Killer an 8.8 out of 10 in GameSpot, lauding the depth, complexity, and realism of the simulation, and the way the different systems and stations are integrated such that the player can naturally switch between them.

Next Generation rated the game four stars out of five.

The game sold more than 200,000 copies.

Reviews
Subsim (December 7, 1997)
Gamezilla (1997)
Game Revolution (September 1, 1997)
PC Jeux (September 1997)

See also
Silent Hunter
Tom Clancy's SSN

References

External links 

1997 video games
Electronic Arts games
Jane's Combat Simulations
Strategy First games
Submarine simulation video games
Windows games
Windows-only games